Adam Bergmark Wiberg (born 7 May 1997) is a Swedish footballer who plays for Öster as a forward.

Club career
After initially joining Öster on loan, on 22 June 2022 Bergmark Wiberg moved to the club permanently and signed a contract until 2024.

Personal life 
Adam Bergmark Wiberg's grandfather is the Swedish football legend Orvar Bergmark. His cousin Niclas Bergmark plays for Örebro SK.

Honours

Club 
Djurgården
 Allsvenskan: 2019

References

External links 
 Djurgården profile 
 
 

1997 births
Allsvenskan players
Association football forwards
Djurgårdens IF Fotboll players
Falkenbergs FF players
Gefle IF players
Living people
Örgryte IS players
Östers IF players
Footballers from Stockholm
Superettan players
Swedish footballers